Saint Augustine's University Historic Chapel is a historic Episcopal chapel located on the campus of St. Augustine's University near downtown Raleigh, North Carolina. Built in 1895, it is one of the oldest buildings on the campus of St. Augustine's and has been designated as a Raleigh Historic Landmark.

The chapel was built with the patronage of the Episcopal Church Freedmen's Bureau. Episcopal priest Rev. Henry Beard Delany directed the construction; at the time he was an instructor of carpentry and masonry, as well as a chaplain and musician. The chapel was built by students of the college using stone from the Raleigh area.

The chapel houses the cathedra of the Episcopal Bishop of North Carolina, a memorial of Henry Delany's consecration as the first African American Episcopal Bishop in North Carolina.

See also
St. Mark's Chapel (Raleigh, North Carolina)

References 

Episcopal church buildings in North Carolina
Churches in Raleigh, North Carolina
St. Augustine's University (North Carolina)
University and college chapels in the United States
Churches on the National Register of Historic Places in North Carolina
National Register of Historic Places in Wake County, North Carolina
Episcopal chapels in the United States
Religious buildings and structures completed in 1895